Cox Lake may refer to:

 Cox Lake (Nova Scotia)
 Cox Lake (British Columbia)

See also
Coxs Lake